Christopher Koby Osei-Wusu (born December 26, 1995) is an Ghanaian-American professional soccer player who plays as an attacking midfielder for FC Malaga City in the Spanish División de Honor.

He has previously played for Richmond Kickers and Orlando City B and played college soccer for the George Washington Colonials.

Early life 
Osei-Wusu was born on December 26, 1995, in Washington D.C. He played high school soccer at DeMatha Catholic High School. In 2013, He was named to the Washington Post All-Met Second Team and All-Gazette First Team after scoring six goals and adding five assists as a senior. Helped the Stags to an NSCAA national championship in 2011 and to WCAC titles in 2011 and 2013. DeMatha was ranked among the best in the nation by a number of polls throughout his scholastic career. Osei-Wusu also played with D.C. United Academy and Bethesda-Olney Academy in the  U.S. Soccer Development Academy (USSDA).

College and Amateur 
Osei-Wusu played four years of college soccer at George Washington University between 2014 and 2017, making 63 appearances. In his sophomore season he saw action in 16 games and made 14 starts and led GW with five assists, tied for first in the A-10 league play averaging 0.31 assists per game. Three of his five assists came on game-winning goals while logging 1,221 minutes on the pitch thought the season.
In his Senior Season he led the team to their second playoff run in 4 years scoring 4 goals and tallying 7 assists.
While in college, he spent the 2016 PDL season with the Jersey Express.

Club career

Richmond Kickers 
Following college, Osei-Wusu signed with the Richmond Kickers of the USL Championship side on March 12, 2018. On March 24, 2018, Osei-Wusu made his debut, playing the full 90 minutes in a 0-1 loss to Indy Eleven. While playing with the Richmond Kickers, he was called up to play and train with Major League Soccer side D.C. United. During this brief loan stint, on September 19, 2019, he was selected to United's 18 man roster and played against CD Olimpia in the Audi International Match.

Orlando City B 
Osei-Wusu joined Orlando City B ahead of the inaugural season of USL League One. He captained the team throughout the season and scored on his debut for the team on March 30, 2019, as part of a 3–1 loss to FC Tucson in the season opener.

FC Malaga City 
In February 2021, Osei-Wusu joined FC Malaga City.

International 
Osei-Wusu is eligible to play for Ghana via his parents and was invited to train with the Ghana U-20's in 2015 in order to prepare for the Youth African Cup of Nations. He was the first American-born Ghanaian to be called into a national team camp.

References

External links 
 

1995 births
Living people
American soccer players
American sportspeople of Ghanaian descent
Association football midfielders
George Washington Colonials men's soccer players
Jersey Express players
Orlando City B players
People from Bowie, Maryland
Richmond Kickers players
Soccer players from Maryland
USL Championship players
USL League One players
USL League Two players